One Billion Americans: The Case for Thinking Bigger is a book by Matthew Yglesias, first published in 2020. One Billion Americans argues that America is not over-crowded and could have one billion citizens, and still have less than half the population density that Germany has today. Additionally, it makes the case that America is justified for wanting to stay relevant into the far distant future, and that in order to do so, it will need to be populated like China and India.

In order to support growth, Yglesias argues for a variety of programs, including increased government spending on child care and day care, the use of S-trains for urban transportation, and increased immigration to the United States, under the general rubric of increasing the American population. It suggests that a substantial increase to the population of the United States is necessary to perpetuate American hegemony. The book gives special attention to housing policy, critiquing zoning requirements that limit urban density in American cities.

Critical response
Kirkus Reviews wrote that "the thesis is eminently arguable, but the book is packed full of provocative ideas well worth considering". Publishers Weekly called Yglesias's arguments about environmental impacts "not entirely convincing", but praised his proposals on immigration and cities, calling the book an optimistic call to action that is worth considering.

Jacob Bacharach panned One Billion Americans in a review for The New Republic, arguing that the policies it recommends are only loosely connected to Yglesias's central proposal to vastly increase the population of the United States. Felix Salmon, reviewing One Billion Americans for The New York Times, agreed that Yglesias's individual proposals were mostly good, but largely irrelevant to the aim of a vastly increased American population, which even he admits "may be impossible and absurd".

Blogger Noah Smith called One Billion Americans "a very good book" which argued especially powerfully that America's current population is sparse, though he would have liked a more vivid and illustrative portrait of what a densely populated America would be like, and why beyond geopolitics it would be a better place to live. Barton Swaim of The Wall Street Journal had faint praise for Yglesias's pro-natalism, while damning his perceived hypocrisy in supporting a "left-liberal orthodoxy" that devalues the family and promotes excessive access to abortion and birth control and questioning his overall sincerity.

Nathan J. Robinson in Current Affairs called it "bizarre and deranged ... utterly insane" of Yglesias to treat greater American power relative to the People's Republic of China as a legitimate goal, saying it amounted to "a belief that United Statesians are superior to others and deserve more", and that Yglesias was unwilling to even consider that America was bad and should have less power because he was "infected with the brain disease of nationalism". Conversely, Razib Khan in National Review praised Yglesias's "liberal nationalist" conviction that a strong and powerful America is good for the whole world, calling it "firmly in the traditional mainstream" versus the anti-patriotic taboos of leftist cultural elites; he did feel that Yglesias could have been more convincing in places, and seemed to take the implications of his proposals rather lightly.

See also
Demographic history of the United States
Demographics of the United States
Immigration to the United States
People and organizations arguing that Canada should increase its population to 100 million:
Century Initiative
Doug Saunders, in his book Maximum Canada: Why 35 Million Canadians Are Not Enough (2017)

References 

2020 non-fiction books
Books about immigration to the United States
Books about the United States
Books about urbanism
Public policy
Random House books